The 1969–70 NBA season was the Detroit Pistons' 22nd season in the NBA and 13th season in the city of Detroit.  The team played at Cobo Arena in Detroit.

It was a challenging season for Detroit, which started in the pre-season when rising star Dave Bing signed a future contract with the Washington Caps of the rival American Basketball Association. Bing would re-sign with the Pistons the following season when the Washington ABA team moved to Virginia.  The team also changed coaches, bringing in Butch Van Breda Kolff, who had been forced out from the Los Angeles Lakers after feuding with star Wilt Chamberlain.  The Pistons would finish the season with a 31-51 (.378) record, 7th in the NBA Eastern Division, the 14th straight losing season for the franchise.  The Pistons were led on the season by Bing (22.9 ppg, 6.0 apg) and guard Jimmy Walker (20.8 ppg, NBA All-Star).

Roster

Regular season

Season standings

x – clinched playoff spot

Record vs. opponents

Game log

References

Detroit Pistons seasons
Detroit
Detroit Pistons
Detroit Pistons